Presidential elections were held in Austria on 26 April 1992, with a second round held on 24 May 1992 after no candidate won a majority in the first round. Incumbent president Kurt Waldheim did not seek reelection as he had not gained acceptance in the international community. The strongest party at that time, the Social Democratic Party, proposed the current minister of traffic and nationalized industries, Rudolf Streicher, for the office, while the Austrian People's Party put up career diplomat Thomas Klestil. Streicher won the first ballot by a small margin, but did not obtain the necessary majority of votes to avoid a second round. However, with the candidates of the smaller parties out in the second ballot, and after a recommendation by Jörg Haider to vote for Klestil, the latter won the second round by an unexpectedly wide margin.

Results

Results by state

First round

Second round

References

Austria
President
Presidential elections in Austria
Austria
Austria